The TIFF Tribute Awards are an annual award, presented by the Toronto International Film Festival to honour distinguished achievements in filmmaking. Unlike the festival's regular awards, which are presented based on audience or jury voting during the festival, the TIFF Tribute Awards are presented to people or organizations selected by the board and announced in advance of the festival. Recipients are selected from among the cast and crew of the films in that year's festival lineup.

The awards were presented for the first time at the 2019 Toronto International Film Festival. They are organized in part as a fundraiser, with proceeds from audience ticket sales used to help fund various TIFF programs and initiatives.

Awards are presented in five main categories: Actor, with two performers honoured each year; Director, honouring a film director; Artisan, honouring a craftsperson in a behind the scenes role such as cinematography, editing or sound; Emerging Talent, honouring a film director for their debut feature film; and the Impact Award, honouring a figure whose work has been dedicated to social change. A sixth award, the Share Her Journey Groundbreaker Award, was introduced in 2022 for women who have made outstanding contributions to improving the conditions of other women in the film industry; actress Michelle Yeoh was the inaugural recipient. An additional Special Tribute award may be presented at the TIFF board's discretion, to honour a person for distinguished achievements in other fields not covered by one of the main categories; both times that a Special Tribute award has been presented to date, it has been to a musician with significant film soundtrack credits who was the subject of a retrospective documentary film screening at that year's festival.

The Impact Award was presented in the inaugural year to the film studio Participant Media, with CEO Jeffrey Skoll accepting the award on the company's behalf; the company subsequently signed on as a direct sponsor of that award, which has since been known as the Jeff Skoll Award in Impact Media.

At both the 2020 Toronto International Film Festival and the 2021 Toronto International Film Festival, due to the COVID-19 pandemic in Canada the Tribute Awards were conducted as partially prerecorded television broadcasts rather than live gala ceremonies. The presentations were broadcast by CTV Television Network, and hosted by Tyrone Edwards and Chloe Wilde of CTV's eTalk, and also featured the announcement of the finalists and winners for the People's Choice Award. With the 2022 Toronto International Film Festival returning to in-person screenings, the 2022 Tribute Awards were not televised; with the 2022 ceremony scheduled for early in the festival run rather than the conclusion, it also did not include People's Choice announcements.

The 2022 awards also marked the first time that one of the actor awards was presented to an ensemble cast instead of an individual performer.

2019

2020

2021

2022

References

Toronto International Film Festival awards
Awards established in 2019
2019 establishments in Ontario